Qomish (also Romanized as Qomīsh, Qomesh, Komash, Kumāsh, Qamesh, Qamsh, and Qomāsh) is a village in Itivand-e Jonubi Rural District, Kakavand District, Delfan County, Lorestan Province, Iran. At the 2006 census, its population was 596, in 100 families.

References 

Towns and villages in Delfan County